Evagrius or Euagrius may refer to:

People

Evagrius of Constantinople (fourth century), bishop of Constantinople (circa 370–380)
Evagrius of Antioch, bishop of Antioch (388-392)
Evagrius Ponticus (346–399), Christian mystic
Evagrius Scholasticus (sixth century), historian

Biology
 Evagrius, a junior synonym of Elasmopoda, a genus of true bugs in the family Coreidae